Minnagara was a city of the Indo-Scythian kingdom, located on the Indus river in modern Pakistan, north of the coastal city of Barbaricum, or along the Narmada river, upstream of Barygaza. There were two cities named Minnagara, one on Indus River delta near Karachi and the other at Narmada River delta near modern Bharuch.

Minnagara is mentioned in the 1st century CE Periplus of the Erythraean Sea:

"Beyond this region (Gedrosia), the continent making a wide curve from the east across the depths of the bays, there follows the coast district of Scythia, which lies above toward the north; the whole marshy; from which flows down the river Sinthus, the greatest of all the rivers that flow into the Erythraean Sea, bringing down an enormous volume of water (...) This river has seven mouths, very shallow and marshy, so that they are not navigable, except the one in the middle; at which by the shore, is the market-town, Barbaricum. Before it there lies a small island, and inland behind it is the metropolis of Scythia, Minnagara; it is subject to Parthian princes who are constantly driving each other out."

A second Minnagara is mentioned in the Periplus, which seems to be upstream of Barigaza:

Ptolemy also mentioned Minnagara, which, according to his explanations, would be along the Narmada river, upstream of Barigaza, and below Ujjain:

Minnagara may be identical with the Manjábarí of the Arab geographers.

Alternatively, "Nagara" being the Sanskrit word for "town", the city itself may have been called "Min", a name found in Isidorus of Charax as a Scythian city in Sakastan (Lassen).

See also 
 Maheshwar
 Krokola
 Kolachi (port)
 Debal
 Bhambore
 Barbarice
 Periplus of the Erythraean Sea
 Oraea
 Barbarikon

Notes

External links
Minnagara, Persian History
History of Sindh

History of Karachi
Former populated places in Pakistan
Populated places along the Silk Road